The 2004 Pittsburgh Steelers season  was the franchise's 72nd season as a professional sports franchise and as a member of the National Football League. It would be the first season the franchise would have under quarterback Ben Roethlisberger. He would play 18 seasons as a Steeler, a franchise record. 

The team looked to come back after a disappointing 6–10 season the year before, which saw the team go through the entire season without winning consecutive games.

The team  finished with a 15–1 record, topping the 14–2 team record from 1978 and joined the 1984 San Francisco 49ers, the 1985 Chicago Bears, and the 1998 Minnesota Vikings as the only teams in NFL history to that point since the league adopted a 16-game schedule in 1978 to finish with such a record. This also made the Steelers the first AFC team to achieve a 15–1 record, a conference-best at the time (the 2007 Patriots would surpass that by going a perfect 16–0); they are also the only AFC team to do so. Along the way, the Steelers ended the New England Patriots NFL-record 21-game winning streak in Week 8, then defeated their cross-state rival the Philadelphia Eagles the following week to hand the NFL's last two undefeated teams their first losses in back-to-back weeks, both at home.

The season was highlighted by the surprising emergence of rookie quarterback Ben Roethlisberger, the team's top pick in that year's draft. Originally intended to sit behind veteran Tommy Maddox the entire season, plans abruptly changed when Maddox was hurt in the team's Week 2 loss to Baltimore. Surrounded by talent, "Big Ben" went an NFL-record 13–0 as a rookie starting quarterback before being rested for the final game of the season, shattering the old NFL record (and coincidentally, also the team record) of 6–0 to start an NFL career set by Mike Kruczek filling in for an injured Terry Bradshaw in 1976.

The Steelers hosted the AFC Championship for the fifth time in eleven years. However, for the fourth time in that same span, the Steelers lost at home one game away from the Super Bowl, and, like in 2001, lost to the Patriots in a rematch from Week 8.

The 2006 edition of Pro Football Prospectus listed the 2004 Steelers as one of their "Heartbreak Seasons", in which teams "dominated the entire regular season only to falter in the playoffs, unable to close the deal." Said Pro Football Prospectus, "In the playoffs, Roethlisberger hit an inconvenient slump, just like the Pittsburgh quarterbacks who came before him. He threw two killer interceptions against the Jets, but the Steelers were bailed out when Jets kicker Doug Brien missed a game-winning field goal. The next week against New England, head coach Bill Cowher was clearly worried about Roethlisberger, letting him throw only once on first or second down in the first quarter. By the time the offense opened up, the Patriots were beating the Steelers by two touchdowns. A Roethlisberger interception was returned 87 yards for a touchdown by Rodney Harrison, and the game was effectively over. For the second time in seven years, a 15–1 team had failed to make it to the Super Bowl." This was the first of, through the 2022 season, 19 consecutive non-losing seasons for the Steelers.

Personnel

Notable additions include Ben Roethlisberger and Willie Parker.

Roster

Offseason
The Steelers went into the NFL draft with the eleventh overall pick, their highest selection since selecting Plaxico Burress eighth overall in 2000. Although the team was ready to select Miami University quarterback Ben Roethlisberger if he were to still be available, the team was ready to select other players at "need" positions. However, with Roethlisberger still available, the team snatched him up, making him the third quarterback selected. Alongside Eli Manning, Philip Rivers, and J. P. Losman, Roethlisberger was part of the "Class of 2004" quarterbacks. In addition, "Big Ben" became the first quarterback the Steelers selected with their first-round pick since they selected Mark Malone in 1980.

Free agent-wise, the Steelers would sign former Philadelphia Eagles running back Duce Staley. Many thought this signing was the team preparing for a future without Jerome Bettis. However, Staley's injury-prone history from Philly would continue with the Steelers. On the undrafted front, the team signed North Carolina running back Willie Parker. Although Parker would play sparingly his rookie season, he would become a major component of the offense in the future. The team also signed veteran punter Chris Gardocki (releasing longtime punter Josh Miller in the process), who up to that point was best remembered by Steelers fans for flipping head coach Bill Cowher the finger twice on live TV after being leveled by Joey Porter while Gardocki was with the Cleveland Browns. (Porter would be penalized for roughing the punter.) Gardocki was fined $5,000 for the incident, and his signing by the team made him the only player to have played for Cowher and give him an expletive in public.

The most notable releases made in the offseason included releasing veteran defensive players Jason Gildon and Dewayne Washington, who both would subsequently sign with the Jacksonville Jaguars and would both play against the Steelers in Week 13.

In the personnel department, the Steelers went back to the future with the return of "Mean Joe" Greene and Dick LeBeau to the organization. Greene, who along with the entire Arizona Cardinals coaching staff was fired after the dismissal of head coach Dave McGinnis, retired from coaching and returned to the Black & Gold as the "special assistant of player personnel" for the team. Meanwhile, LeBeau, who popularized the zone blitz defensive schemes as the team's defensive coordinator in the mid-1990s (referred to as "Blitzburgh" by fans), returned to the team in that same capacity after a brief stint with the Buffalo Bills, replacing the fired Tim Lewis.

This would also be the final season for longtime Steelers radio color commentator Myron Cope, who missed several games this year due to poor health. It was one of only two times in 35 years that Cope would miss time broadcasting for the Steelers, the other being the 1994 season after the death of his wife. Though Cope would later recover, he felt that it was best to retire, and did so at the end of the season.

Preseason

Schedule

Regular season

Schedule

Note: Intra-divisional opponents are in bold text.

Game summaries

Week 1: vs. Oakland Raiders 

It was the 22nd lifetime meeting between the two clubs.  The Raiders erased a 21-13 Steelers lead in the fourth quarter but Jeff Reed connected on the winning field goal with seven seconds left.  With the win, the Steelers started their season 1–0 for the 2nd straight year.  Jerome Bettis scored 18 points (3 Touchdowns) on 5 carries, yet gained only 1 yard total for an average of 0.2 yards per carry.

Week 2: at Baltimore Ravens  

With the loss, the Steelers fell to 1–1 for the 2nd straight year.  0–1 in division games and 1–1 in conference games.

Week 3: at Miami Dolphins  

The game was originally to be played at 1:00 pm, but was delayed until evening due to Hurricane Jeanne. The game was not broadcast nationally, it was only shown on local stations in the primary and secondary markets of the two teams. With the win, the Steelers improved to 2–1. The contest marked Ben Roethlisberger's first NFL start and victory.

Week 4: vs. Cincinnati Bengals 

With the win the Steelers improved to 3–1. 1–1 in division games.

Week 5: vs. Cleveland Browns  

With their 2nd straight win over the Browns, the Steelers improved to 4–1.

Week 6: at Dallas Cowboys  

Source: ESPN
    
    
    
    
    
    
    
    

It was the 29th meeting between the two clubs.  The Cowboys jumped to a 20-10 lead following a Keyshawn Johnson touchdown catch in the third, but Ben Roethlisberger led two touchdown drives, the last a Jerome Bettis run with thirty seconds to go.  The Cowboys raced to the Steelers 30 but a last-second touchdown attempt was swatted away by Russell Stuvaints.  With the win, the Steelers went on their bye week 5–1.

Week 8: vs. New England Patriots  

This was the game that ended New England's NFL-record 21-game winning streak.  Following an Adam Vinatieri field goal in the first quarter, the Steelers erupted, as Ben Roethlisberger twice hit Plaxico Burress for touchdowns and a Tom Brady interception was run back by Deshea Townsend for a touchdown and a 21–3 Steelers lead after one quarter.  Brady was picked off twice and Roethlisberger made no mistakes in throwing for 196 yards and amassing a quarterback rating of 126.4.  The Steelers routed the Patriots 34–20 and wound up winning the No. 1 seed in the AFC playoffs as a result.  With the win, the Steelers improved to 6–1.

Week 9: vs. Philadelphia Eagles  

Source: ESPN
    
    
    
    
    
    

The Steelers for the 2nd week in a row face an undefeated team, the 7–0 Eagles.  With the win, the Steelers improved to 7–1 while the Eagles dropped to 7–1.  The game gained wider notoriety in subsequent days following broadcast of footage from the Eagles sideline where Terrell Owens was angrily barking at Donovan McNabb with McNabb striving to ignore him.

Week 10: at Cleveland Browns  

With their 3rd straight win over the Browns, the Steelers improved to 8–1.

Week 11: at Cincinnati Bengals  

The Bengals clawed to a 14-10 lead on two Carson Palmer touchdowns, but Roethlisberger, despite being sacked seven times, tossed a touchdown late in the third quarter to Dan Kreider, then late in the fourth Palmer dropped back to his own endzone and threw an incompletion; it was ruled intentional grounding and the resulting Pittsburgh safety finished off the game.

Week 12: vs. Washington Redskins  

With the win the Steelers improved to 10–1 and went 3–0 against the NFC East.

Week 13: at Jacksonville Jaguars  

For the first time Jerome Bettis was not the all-time active rushing leader in the NFL upon kickoff, as he and Curtis Martin dueled throughout the season for the title, Bettis would retake the title by game's end.

Week 14: vs. New York Jets  

In an NFL first, both running backs came into the game ready to break the 13,000 career yards mark, Jerome Bettis having a 6-yard lead over native Curtis Martin.  After the game Martin would lead Bettis by 9 yards.

Week 15: at New York Giants  

Source: ESPN
    
    
    
    
    
    
    
    
    
    
    
    

This was the first meeting between rookie quarterbacks Ben Roethlisberger and Eli Manning and was part of a rare NFL Saturday triple-header.  The game lead tied or changed seven times as Manning and Roethlisberger combined for 498 passing yards; Antwaan Randle El also got into the act with a ten-yard touchdown throw to Verron Haynes, this atop 149 receiving yards.  Jerome Bettis rushed 36 times for 140 yards and the winning touchdown in the final five minutes.  With 3:31 to go Eli was intercepted by Willie J. Williams.  Giants coach Tom Coughlin challenged the ruling but after review it was upheld, and the Steelers ran out the clock for the 33-30 win.

Week 16: vs. Baltimore Ravens 

Jerome Bettis retook the all-time active rushing record from his season-long duel with native Curtis Martin by a margin of 81 yards, and also pass Eric Dickerson for fourth all-time.

The win also helped the team improve to 14-1.  This would tie the team's franchise record in number of wins in a season.

Week 17: at Buffalo Bills  

With the win, the Steelers finish with a league-best 15–1 record.

Playoffs

Schedule

Game Summaries

AFC Divisional: vs. New York Jets 

After a brilliant 15–1 regular season the Steelers pulled one out of the fire in the divisional playoffs against the Jets.  Ben Roethlisberger was intercepted at the Jets 14-yard line and Reggie Tongue ran back an 86-yard touchdown in the third quarter.  After tying the game at 17 in the fourth the Steelers had to sweat out a Jets drive in the final minutes of regulation. The Jets set up for a Doug Brien 47-yard field goal but the kick missed, hitting the crossbar.  On the ensuing possession, Roethlisberger was intercepted again and another Brien field goal was set up, this one from 43 yards away – but it again missed, sailing wide left.  In overtime, the Jets won the kick-off but failed to score on their first possession. The Steelers, then, drove down field and Jeff Reed's 33-yard field goal ended a 20–17 Pittsburgh win.

AFC Championship: vs. New England Patriots 

Revenge for their Halloween loss drove the 14–2 Patriots back to Heinz Field and the conference championship.  The shaky play of the Steelers against the Jets the week before was exploited by New England as Ben Roethlisberger was intercepted almost right away, then on their next possession the Steelers were stopped on downs.  The Patriots raced to a 17–3 lead in the second quarter before Roethlisberger drove them down field and threw a back-breaking interception to Rodney Harrison at the Patriots 13-yard line; Harrison ran back the 87-yard touchdown and fans at Heinz began chanting for Tommy Maddox to come in to replace Roethlisberger.  The Steelers managed a pair of third-quarter touchdowns (a 5-yard Jerome Bettis run and a 30-yard Roethlisberger pass to Hines Ward) but these only sandwiched another Patriots score (a 25-yard run by ex-Bengal Corey Dillon) and the Steelers simply could not overcome New England's offense as the Patriots finished off Pittsburgh 41–27, the third playoff win in four career tries by the Patriots over the Steelers.

The game is also significant as the final game by the team's radio broadcaster, Myron Cope. Cope had served as the color commentator on the team's radio broadcast for 35 years. He would publicly announce his retirement five months later.

Standings

Honors and awards
 Ben Roethlisberger, AP NFL Offensive Rookie of the Year 
 Ben Roethlisberger, Diet Pepsi NFL Rookie of the Year

Pro Bowl Representatives
See: 2005 Pro Bowl

 No. 36 Jerome Bettis- Running Back (alternate)
 No. 43 Troy Polamalu- Strong Safety
 No. 51 James Farrior- Inside Linebacker
 No. 55 Joey Porter- Outside Linebacker
 No. 64 Jeff Hartings- Center
 No. 66 Alan Faneca- Offensive Guard
 No. 77 Marvel Smith- Offensive Tackle (alternate)
 No. 86 Hines Ward- Wide Receiver
 No. 91 Aaron Smith- Defensive End (alternate)

References

External links 
 2004 Pittsburgh Steelers season at Pro Football Reference 
 2004 Pittsburgh Steelers season statistics at jt-sw.com 

Pittsburgh Steelers seasons
Pittsburgh
AFC North championship seasons
Pitts